The Public Servants Association of South Africa (PSA) is a trade union for public sector workers in South Africa.

The PSA the largest politically non-affiliated trade union for public servants in the country.  It was founded in 1920 and has a membership of more than 235,000 members.  Long independent, in 2017 it affiliated to the Federation of Unions of South Africa.

As per the Labour Relations Act passed in 1995, the PSA uses collective bargaining to represents its members' interests in labour disputes free of charge. Disputes may include negotiating fair terms of remuneration, employee benefits (such as medical aid, pension, and housing subsidies), and working conditions (such as working hours, leave of absence, and occupational safety and health).

References

External links
 PSA official site.

Trade unions established in 1920
Trade unions in South Africa
Public sector trade unions